Hannu Kojo (born July 30, 1953 in Mikkeli) is a Finnish sprint canoer who competed in the late 1970s and early 1980s. Competing in two Summer Olympics, he earned his best finish of sixth in the K-2 500 m event at Montreal in 1976.

References
Sports-reference.com profile

1953 births
Living people
People from Mikkeli
Canoeists at the 1976 Summer Olympics
Canoeists at the 1980 Summer Olympics
Finnish male canoeists
Olympic canoeists of Finland
Sportspeople from South Savo